Sabo Bhadiar is a village of district Sialkot, and in tehsil Pasrur, near Qila Kallar Wala with population of 10,000-15,000.

References

Villages in Sialkot District